Eileen Cecile Ford (née Otte; March 25, 1922 – July 9, 2014) was an American model agency executive and co-founder of  Ford Models with her husband, Gerard "Jerry" Ford, in 1946. Ford Models was one of the earliest internationally recognized modelling agencies in the world.

Early life
Eileen Cecile Ottensoser was born in Manhattan and raised in suburban Great Neck, Long Island, the only daughter of four children of Loretta Marie (née Laine) and Nathaniel Otte. Eileen had been a model during the summers of her freshman and sophomore years at Barnard College, modeling for the Harry Conover Modeling Agency, one of the first in the United States. She graduated from Barnard in 1943.

The next year, she met her future husband, Gerard "Jerry" Ford, at a drugstore near the Columbia University campus and eloped with him, marrying in November 1944 in San Francisco. Shortly thereafter, Jerry, who was in the Navy, was shipped out for World War II. In his absence, Eileen became photographer Elliot Clark's secretary, then later a fashion stylist, copywriter, and fashion reporter for The Tobe Report.

Ford Modeling Agency
A pregnant Eileen started to work as a secretary for several models, taking calls at her father's New York City law office, charging each model $65 to $75 per month. After giving birth to her first child, daughter Jamie in March 1947, she continued to work hard. Jerry returned from the war in March 1946, and despite knowing nothing about the fashion industry, he joined Eileen in creating an agency. After only a year, Eileen and Jerry sold their car and relocated their agency to a third-floor walkup on Second Avenue.

Although the Fords' location was terrible, within a year, the modeling agency was the second or third most successful in the United States, grossing $250,000. The Fords' first superstar model was Jean Patchett. The Fords had the capital to instill the voucher system, something that other modeling agencies were not affluent enough to offer. Dorian Leigh described Eileen as "one of the hardest working, most persistent persons I have ever known, two qualities which made her my very good friend for years and later, my unanticipated enemy".

After two years, the Fords began to seriously compete with the Huntington Hartford modeling agency and the John Robert Powers agencies, the two most successful modeling agencies at the time. Leigh, meanwhile, closed her modeling agency when she was pregnant with her third child in 1948. Leigh called Eileen and told them that her 15-years younger sister, Suzy Parker, was making only $25 per hour working as a model for Huntington Hartford. Leigh felt Suzy, although only 16 years old, should be making $40 per hour, and told Ford she would join her two-year-old agency only if they took Parker sight-unseen. Anxious to represent Leigh, they agreed. Expecting a younger version of the raven-haired, blue-eyed, very slender, 5'4" Dorian, the Fords were shocked to see Parker was 5'10" with green eyes, and freckles.

They soon realized, however, that Parker had the possibility of becoming quite a successful model. Soon thereafter, Parker would become the most successful model of the 1950s, helping push the Ford's agency to number one. In the 1940s and 1950s, the Fords represented top models Mary Jane Russell, Carmen Dell'Orefice, and Dovima. By 1954, the Fords were extremely successful and were living in a duplex apartment on Park Avenue. To make sure that their models were the most successful, the Fords provided hair dressers, dermatologists, and Eileen dispensed diet advice constantly. She allowed models to live with her to "keep a close eye on them so they'd stay out of trouble and make their early morning appointments". Eleven (11) of Ford's busiest models were featured on the April 1955 issue of McCall's magazine (Parker, Leigh, Jean Patchett, Patsy Shally, Lillian Marcuson, Nan Rees, Leonie Vernet, Georgia Hamilton, Dolores Hawkins, Kathy Dennis, and Mary Jane Russell). Ford pushed for standardized hours and wages. She enforced rules about what models could and could not do (for example, showing “excessive amounts of bosom” in a photo was a no-no).

The Fords' marriage became tense. Jerry told Eileen to "mend (your) ways or we'll be divorced!" She told author Michael Gross in a 1990s interview, "... so I mended my ways. That's why I'm so docile now." By the late 1950s, Eileen had given birth to four children: Jamie, Billy, Katie, and Lacey.

In 1957, Leigh, aged 40 and retired from modeling, was living in France. She decided to start another modeling agency, this time in France. The police and courts insisted she was running an illegal employment agency, and she was fined. After World War II, employment agencies were declared illegal. Leigh contacted the Fords about starting a legitimate modeling agency, the first of its kind in that country. She continued to run a successful agency, but in 1959 was charged in court again. After hiring a lawyer, she finally won her case. The Fords agreed to expand their modeling business into Europe, and Leigh would represent them in France as well as scout for potential models all over Europe. Leigh was so successful that she opened branches in London and Hamburg, Germany. She would trade her European models for Ford's American models and vice versa.

In the early 1960s, Ford represented then-model Martha Stewart, who like Eileen, went to Barnard College. Stewart modeled briefly in her late teens and early 20s, including for Chanel. In the 1970s, Stewart catered parties and weddings with Dorian Leigh, who became a cordon bleu level chef after retiring from the fashion industry. On the twentieth anniversary of the Ford Agency in 1966, Jerry Ford told The New York Times that they were billing $100,000 per week and that they were the first modeling agency to have a computer system. They had 175 female and 75 male models that booked 70% of modeling jobs in New York City and 30% worldwide.

Their top models in the 1960s included Wilhelmina Cooper (who would go on to run a successful modeling agency of her own in the 1970s, until her death from lung cancer due to heavy smoking in 1980, at age 40), Jean Shrimpton, Ann Turkel, Agneta Frieberg, Ali MacGraw, Candice Bergen, Tilly Tizani, Sondra Peterson, and Donna Michelle. In 1968, Ford produced Eileen Ford's Book of Model Beauty, which gave beauty tips and nutrition and exercise advice. The book included a biography and photos of Ford's most successful models from the 1950s and 1960s.

In the early 1970s, Ford was still the number-one modeling agency in the world. It represented Jerry Hall, Christie Brinkley, Rene Russo, Kim Basinger, Janice Dickinson, Lauren Hutton, Karen Graham, Susan Blakely, and others. Hutton and Graham were the earliest models to get exclusive make-up contracts with Revlon and Estée Lauder. By 1977 however, John Casablancas, who started Elite, began to poach Ford's top models and her top booking agent, Monique Pillard. The Fords tried to sue Casablancas, and hired famed attorney Roy Cohn. They also competed with several smaller modeling agencies, such as Wilhelmina, which represented such late 1970s models as Gia Carangi, Patti Hansen and Shaun Casey.

During this time, Ford Models expanded their agency. A successful Men's Division would dominate the pages of GQ magazine. In 1975, the Fords started a children's division. In her Lifetime Intimate Portrait, Eileen Ford said they started that division with Brooke Shields, then 9 years old, in mind. Shields was already an established model when the Fords signed her. She shot her first national advertising campaign with Francesco Scavullo in 1966 for Ivory soap. It was during that first year with Ford that she shot the infamous photos with photographer Garry Gross. According to court records, Brooke was paid $450 for the photo session.

By the late 1970s, the "model wars" between Elite and Ford were in full stride with top models going back-and-forth between Elite, Ford, and smaller agencies like Zoli, which represented Rachel Ward and Esmé Marshall. By this time, many top models were getting terrible reputations for drug use, staying out all night at Studio 54 and for being very unprofessional.

By the late 1970s and early 1980s, Eileen said several of Ford's models from the 1950s and 1960s had died from smoking and breast cancer. Some 1970s models died from drug use, including Gia Carangi, who died of AIDS in 1986. Top fashion photographers, tired of these models' behavior, refused to work with them any longer. In 1981, the Fords began an international modeling competition called "Face of the 80s", later known as Ford Models Supermodel of the World. By the mid-1980s, drug-addicted blonde models were out, and more professional, brunette-haired models such as Cindy Crawford, Renée Simonsen, Carol Alt, Linda Evangelista, and Christy Turlington came on the scene. As a result, modeling fees rapidly accelerated and several models were making millions of dollars per year. Fashion editor Polly Mellen said, "The girls are getting rich, so rich." Turlington, at the age of 16, moved into Ford's townhouse during the summer of 1985, and would rapidly become one of the Ford's biggest successes ever.

In 1993, Eileen said that her agency received 10,000 letters per year and 7,000 personal visits to her office. Of these, she said, maybe only four or five are "really good ones [models]".

Also in 1993, Ford's home in Tewksbury Township, New Jersey, was almost completely destroyed in a fire. Later that year, they rebuilt an exact replica of the house.

Retirement
In 1995, Katie Ford took over her parents' agency after their retirement. The 50th anniversary of the agency was highlighted in several articles including the July–August 1996 issue of American Photo magazine and in January–February 1997's Top Model magazine ("Ford at 50!"). She was CEO from 1995 to 2007. In December 2007, Ford was sold to Stone Tower Equity Partners. John Caplan took over as CEO while Katie Ford was on the Board of Directors. Jerry Ford died at the age 83 on August 24, 2008. He was survived by his wife, four children, eight grandchildren, and two great-grandchildren.

Eileen Ford's story has been told in Good Housekeeping in 1968, Life in November 1970 and Ladies' Home Journal in 1971 among many others. She appeared in the 1997 film Scratch the Surface about a teen model turned documentary cinematographer, Tara Fitzpatrick's examination of the clothing industry and in Intimate Portrait: Eileen Ford in 1999 and again in Celebrity Profile: Brooke Shields in 2001 and a profile of Christie Brinkley.

Death
She died at a hospital in Morristown, New Jersey, from complications of meningioma and osteoporosis, on July 9, 2014, aged 92.

Publications
 Eileen Ford's Book of Model Beauty by Eileen Ford. Trident Press: New York, (1968) 
 Eileen Ford's a more beautiful you in 21 days, Simon and Schuster: New York (1972);

References

Sources
 Good Housekeeping magazine, 1968.
 Lacey, Robert. Model Woman: Eileen Ford and the Business of Beauty. New York: HarperCollins, 2015.

External links
 Ford Models
BBC Last Word (obituary, spoken word)

1922 births
2014 deaths
Businesspeople from New York City
American fashion businesspeople
People from Great Neck, New York
People from Tewksbury Township, New Jersey
Barnard College alumni
20th-century American businesspeople
20th-century American businesswomen
21st-century American women